Binks may refer to:

 Fred Binks, English footballer
 George Binks, baseball outfielder
 Jimmy Binks, an English cricketer
 Kenneth Binks, Canadian politician
 Les Binks, English heavy metal drummer
 Louis Binks, English footballer
 Sid Binks, professional footballer
 Simon Binks, Australian rock guitarist
 Jar Jar Binks, a fictional Gungan from Star Wars
 Sarah Binks, a novel by Paul Hiebert